Community property may refer to:

 Community property, a marital property regime that originated in civil law jurisdictions and is now also found in some common law jurisdictions
 Public property, property that is owned by the state, city, community or tribe.